Glenea quatuordecimpunctata is a species of beetle in the family Cerambycidae. It was described by Stephan von Breuning in 1956. It is known from Indonesia.

Varietas
 Glenea quatuordecimpunctata var. flavipes Breuning, 1956
 Glenea quatuordecimpunctata var. ochraceomaculata Breuning, 1956

References

quatuordecimpunctata
Beetles described in 1956